Quasi-state-level jihadist groups, including Boko Haram and the Islamic State of Iraq and the Levant, have captured and enslaved women and children, often for sexual slavery. In 2014 in particular, both groups organised mass kidnappings of large numbers of girls and younger women.

Enslavement

By Boko Haram

The first report of slave-taking by Boko Haram was on 13 May 2013 when a video was released of Boko Haram leader Abubakar Shekau saying his group had taken women and children - including teenage girls - hostage in response to the arrest of its members' wives and children.

According to Islamism expert Jonathan N.C. Hill, Boko Haram began kidnapping large numbers of girls and young women for sexual use in 2014. The attacks echoed kidnappings of girls and young women for sexual use by Algerian Islamists in the 1990s and early 2000s, and may reflect influence by al-Qaeda in the Islamic Maghreb.

According to a community leader from Borno state quoted by the BBC, some captured young women and teenage girls held by Boko Haram have been forced to marry one Boko Haram fighter after another as the fighters are killed. "Any time they go for an operation and one of the fighters is killed they will force the young woman to marry another one ... Eventually she becomes a habitual sex slave."

By ISIS

The Economist reports that ISIS (also called "Islamic State") has taken "as many as 2,000 women and children" captive, selling and distributing them as sexual slaves. Some women were reportedly sold via auction and even via online auction to Saudi Arabia and elsewhere. Matthew Barber, a scholar of Yazidi history at the University of Chicago, later stated to have compiled a list of 4,800 captured Yazidi women and children, and estimated that the overall number could be up to 7,000. Yazidi are a small minority who practice a religion based on "a mix of Christian, Islamic, and ancient Mesopotamian beliefs".

According to reports endorsed as credible by The Daily Telegraph, virgins among the captured women were selected and given to commanders as sexual slaves. According to an August 2015 story in The New York Times, "The trade in Yazidi women and girls has created a persistent infrastructure, with a network of warehouses where the victims are held, viewing rooms where they are inspected and marketed, and a dedicated fleet of buses used to transport them."

In April 2015, Zainab Bangura, the United Nations special envoy on sexual violence in conflict, visited Iraq and was given a copy of an Islamic State pamphlet including a list of prices for captured women and children.  According to a story on the list in Bloomberg, the list's authenticity "was established by UN researchers who'd gathered anecdotes on similar slave markets in Islamic State-controlled areas". The captives are non-Muslim minorities, "mostly Arab Christians and Yazidis" who have refused to convert to Islam and whose adult male relatives have been murdered. Bidders for the captive women and children include "the groups own fighters and wealthy Middle Easterners."

Historical background

Medieval to modern period

Female slavery was common during the medieval Arab slave trade, where prisoners of war captured in battle from non-Arab lands often ended up as concubines (who are considered free when their master dies). 
During the Islamic Golden Age, some Muslim jurists writing on military jurisprudence advocated severe penalties for rebels who use "stealth attacks" and practise abductions, poisoning of water wells, arson, attacks against wayfarers and travellers, assaults under the cover of night and rape.

In 1899, Winston Churchill wrote about the Islamic slave trade: "...all [of the Arab tribes in The Sudan], without exception, were hunters of men. To the great slave markets of Jeddah a continual stream of negro captives has flowed for hundreds of years. The invention of gunpowder and the adoption by the Arabs of firearms facilitated the traffic...Thus the situation in the Sudan for several centuries may be summed up as follows: The dominant race of Arab invaders was increasingly spreading its blood, religion, customs, and language among the black aboriginal population, and at the same time it harried and enslaved them...The warlike Arab tribes fought and brawled among themselves in ceaseless feud and strife. The negroes trembled in apprehension of capture, or rose locally against their oppressors."

Abolition period

Earlier in the 20th century, Islamist authors declared slavery outdated without actually clearly affirming and promoting its abolition. This has caused at least one scholar (William Clarence-Smith) to criticize the notable "evasions and silences of Muhammad Qutb". and the "dogged refusal of Abul A'la Maududi to give up on slavery".

Sayyid Qutb, a leading scholar of the Islamist Muslim Brotherhood wrote in his tafsir (commentary of the Quran) that slavery was a way of handling prisoners-of-war and it "was necessary for Islam to adopt a similar line of practise until the world devised a new code of practise during war other than enslavement". Qutb's brother and promoter, Muhammad Qutb, vigorously defended Islamic slavery, telling his audience that "Islam gave spiritual enfranchisement to slaves" and "in the early period of Islam the slave was exalted to such a noble state of humanity as was never before witnessed in any other part of the world." He contrasted the adultery, prostitution, and (what he called) "that most odious form of animalism" casual sex that are found in Europe, with (what he called) "that clean and spiritual bond that ties a maid [i.e. slave girl] to her master in Islam."

Abul A'la Maududi, the founder of Jamaat-e-Islami in the early 20th century, meanwhile wrote:

According to some scholars, there has been a "reopening" of the issue of slavery by some conservative Salafi Islamic scholars after its "closing" earlier in the 20th century when Muslim countries banned slavery and "most Muslim scholars" found the practice "inconsistent with Qur'anic morality."

21st-century Islamist revival

In response to the  Nigerian extremist group Boko Haram's Quranic justification for kidnapping and enslaving people,  and ISIL's religious justification for enslaving Yazidi women as spoils of war as claimed in their digital magazine Dabiq, 126 Islamic scholars from around the Muslim world, in late September 2014,  signed an open letter to the Islamic State's leader Abu Bakr al-Baghdadi, rejecting his group's interpretations of the Qur'an and hadith to justify its actions. The letter accuses the group of instigating fitna – sedition – by instituting slavery under its rule in contravention of the anti-slavery consensus of the Islamic scholarly community.

ISIS
According to CNN and The Economist, the self-styled Islamic State of Iraq and the Levant "justifies its kidnapping of women as sex slaves citing Islamic theology."  An article entitled, 'The revival (of) slavery before the Hour,' (of Judgement Day),  published in the ISIL online magazine, Dabiq, claimed that Yazidi women can be taken captive and forced to become sex slaves or concubines under Islamic law, "[o]ne should remember that enslaving the families of the kuffar -- the infidels -- and taking their women as concubines is a firmly established aspect of the Shariah, or Islamic law."

It not only justified the taking of slaves but declared that those who "deny or mock" the verses of the Koran or hadith that justified it were apostates from Islam, asserting that concubinage is specifically justified in the Koran:

Yazidi women and children [are to be] divided according to the Shariah amongst the fighters of the Islamic State who participated in the Sinjar operations [in northern Iraq] … Enslaving the families of the kuffar [infidels] and taking their women as concubines is a firmly established aspect of the Shariah that if one were to deny or mock, he would be denying or mocking the verses of the Koran and the narrations of the Prophet … and thereby apostatizing from Islam.

Another article in Dabiq rebuked supporters of ISIS who had denied ISIS had taken slaves "as if the soldiers of the Khilafah had committed a mistake or evil," and promised "slave markets will be established."

ISIL appealed to apocalyptic beliefs and "claimed justification by a Hadith that they interpret as portraying the revival of slavery as a precursor to the end of the world." In late 2014, ISIL released a pamphlet on the treatment of female slaves.

Boko Haram
Abubakar Shekau, the leader of Boko Haram, a Nigerian Islamist group, said in an interview "I shall capture people and make them slaves" when claiming responsibility for the 2014 Chibok kidnapping.  Shekau has justified his actions by appealing to the Quran saying "[w]hat we are doing is an order from Allah, and all that we are doing is in the Book of Allah that we follow."

See also
 Forced marriage
 History of slavery
 Human trafficking
 Islamic sexual jurisprudence
 Raptio – large scale abduction of women
 Sexual jihad
 Sexual slavery § Present day
 History of concubinage in the Muslim world
 Slavery and religion
 Wartime sexual violence

Notes

Citations 

Human commodity auctions
Islam and slavery
Islam-related controversies
Islamic terrorism
Islamism
Persecution of Yazidis by ISIL
Slave trade
21st-century Islamism
Violence against women
Women's rights in Islam